Clement E. G. Spiette (born 24 September 1916 in Illford Essex) was a Belgian canoeist who competed in the 1936 Summer Olympics. In 1936 he and his partner Charles Brahm finished ninth in the K-2 10000 m event. 

Louis Spiette and Joanna Janssens (Clement's parents) Left Belgium during the first World War. They went to England where clement was Born in 1916 During world war I. After the war he returned, In 1946 his first child was born in Belgium.

Champiomships

References
Sports-reference.com Clement Spiette's profile at Sports Reference.com

1916 births
Belgian male canoeists
Canoeists at the 1936 Summer Olympics
Olympic canoeists of Belgium
Year of death missing